Clines Corners is an unincorporated community in Torrance County, New Mexico, United States.

References

External links
Clines Corners Retail Center

Unincorporated communities in Torrance County, New Mexico
Unincorporated communities in New Mexico
Albuquerque metropolitan area